Three Cliffs Bay, otherwise Three Cliff Bay, is a bay on the south coast of the Gower Peninsula in the City and County of Swansea, Wales. The bay takes its name from the three sea cliffs that jut out into the bay. Pennard Pill, a large stream, flows into the sea in the middle of the bay.

The beach is an important asset for locals and visitors and routinely qualifies for Blue Flag status. Dogs are allowed on the beach all year.

It was built in the early 12th century, and is imbued with legends of fairies. It is also the only locality in Britain known for yellow whitlow grass (Draba aizoides).

Individual beaches that make up this bay have their own names, including Pobbles Bay to the east of the Three Cliffs, and Tor Bay to the west. The beaches are separated at high tide but are accessible to each other at low tide on foot over the sands. Paths lead north to Pennard Burrows, east to Pobbles, and west to Tor Bay. Pobbles and Tor Bay are also accessible from the beach at low tide.
Three Cliffs Bay is effectively part of the inlet of Oxwich Bay.  At low tide, Three Cliffs Bay forms a continuous sandy beach with Oxwich Bay beach to the west.  They only exist as separate beaches at high tide.

The largest of the Three Cliffs is easily climbed if approached from the grassy base.

In June 2006 the BBC Holidays at Home programme declared Three Cliffs Bay to be Britain's best beach.
In a recent programme broadcast in the UK the view over Three Cliffs Bay was nominated for "Britain's Best View".

Three Cliffs Bay also appears in a music video entry for Red Hot Chili Peppers made by Swansea film company, Studio8. It was also used in the opening titles of the 80's TV sitcom Me and My Girl featuring Richard O'Sullivan and Joanne Ridley.

Three Cliffs Bay has also been used in Channel 4's Skins and was shown in an ITV advert: 'The Brighter Side'.

References

External links
 Official tourist website for Gower
 Photos of Welsh beaches on BBC Wales Nature & Outdoors

Bays of the Gower Peninsula